Florence Zacks Melton (November 6, 1911 – February 8, 2007) was an American inventor known for innovating the foam-soled and washable slipper.

Early life
Melton was born Florence to Meir and Rebecca Spurgeon in Philadelphia.
Melton grew up in Philadelphia in an extremely poor family. Mostly under the care of her bubble (grandmother) who encourage Jewish values and raised her. Music was a large part of Melton’s childhood which inspired her to study music, art, and ballet.  She worked at a local Woolworth's from age 13 in order to support her family. She married her first husband, Aaron Zacks, when she was 19, and subsequently moved to Columbus, Ohio, where he worked as a merchandiser for a department store. Together they had two sons, Gordon and Barry.

Career

Melton served on the board of United Way (then the Red Feather Agency) and with the Red Cross Nutrition Corps. In the 1970s, she became the first woman to serve on the board of the Huntington National Bank and was a founding member of CAJE (the Coalition for the Advancement of Jewish Education).

Melton co-founded the R.G. Barry Corporation in 1946 with Zacks. While investigating foam latex, a material invented as a helmet liner for World War II tank crewmen, as a possible material for her patented women's shoulder pad, she discovered that she could use the material to line slippers. This foam latex was then made into slippers, which were made of washable terrycloth or velour that came in a variety of colors. Each slipper was different, some had a slightly raised heel, some have backs, some have straps, open toes and some have tassels. The common denominator was that they all have the same foam-rubber insoles that was at least half an inch thick. Marketed first as Angel Treads and later as Dearfoams, Melton's slippers were immediately successful. More than 1 billion slippers have been sold, according to the company.

The Slippers were not Melton’s only idea to reach success. Melton acknowledged that women’s fashion had a military look and common piece was wearing double-breasted suits with padded shoulder. In order to clean these clothing items the shoulder pads had to be removed and sewn back. Melton came up with, Shoulda-Shams, a cotton-batting shoulder pad with an elastic tab that could be snapped to a bra strap terminate the need for sewing.
Even though Melton had the idea for the slipper she never received the role of an officer of the company rather she held the title of consultant. However, she held the patent for the slipper in addition is 18 other patents for products ranging from cushioning devices such as shoulder pads and other physical therapy machines.

Before her death, she served as a consultant for Product Development and Design. Her son, author and speaker Gordon Zacks, served as the CEO of the company. He died on Feb. 1, 2014. Another son, Barry Zacks, founded the Max & Erma's restaurant chain in 1972, taking it public.  He died in 1990.

In 1968, Melton married industrialist and philanthropist Samuel M. Melton. Samuel Melton endowed the Melton Research Center at the Jewish Theological Seminary of America and the Melton Centre at the Hebrew University of Jerusalem where Melton additional become an active partner to her husband’s philanthropic projects. [3] Melton was very passionate about creating a program of study to help adults attain Jewish Literacy. Many were very skeptical of the need for teaching adults about Jewish culture. Concerns about the amount of adults that were interested in Jewish study or would even want to view Jewish Study as serious as the program was outlined.  Together, they created the "Florence Melton Adult Mini-School," a two-year, non-denominational program, which operates in over 70 North American communities, Australia and South Africa.

In the mid 1980s, Melton initiated the "Discovery" program, which attempts to connect youths to their family ancestry, community, different denominations in Judaism, and to Israel. The program involves extensive field trips and culminates in a tour to Israel. Melton is a member of the Commission on Jewish Education in North America.

Melton Schools
Melton was the founder of the Florence Melton Adult Mini-School, a pluralistic adult learning program to enable adults to gain Jewish literacy through a broad and deep curriculum created by scholars and educators at Hebrew University in Jerusalem. The School offers a life-enhancing study of different Jewish texts and ides that further depends on the understanding of Jewish communities worldwide. The school offers adult education based on the Torah and the Talmud. Melton is the largest pluralistic adult Jewish education network in the world with more than 40,000 learners experiences the school’s curriculum. Melton schools all over the globe from Sydney, Australia to Portland, Oregon continue the legacy.

The Melton Centre at Hebrew University in Jerusalem expands to a large community of eager adults that have a string commitment to the sustainability of Jewish culture and heritage. As Israel’s first center for Jewish Education, the Centre offers a wide variety of research and other resources to accentuate the knowledge of its scholars.

References

1911 births
2007 deaths
20th-century American Jews
Women inventors
20th-century American inventors
21st-century American Jews